Zayemye is a rural locality (a village) in Rostilovskoye Rural Settlement, Gryazovetsky District, Vologda Oblast, Russia. The population was 143 as of 2002.

Geography 
Zayemye is located 16 km south of Gryazovets (the district's administrative centre) by road. Obnorskaya Sloboda is the nearest rural locality.

References 

Rural localities in Gryazovetsky District